Alejandro José Suárez Luzardo (born 1965 in Caracas, Venezuela) is a Venezuelan politician and lawyer.

He is member of  a party named Movimiento Sentir Nacional.

He took part in the 2006 Venezuelan presidential election.

References

1965 births
Living people
Politicians from Caracas
20th-century Venezuelan lawyers
21st-century Venezuelan lawyers